The Skyranger 30 is a short range air defense turret system developed Rheinmetall Air Defence AG (formerly Oerlikon) and first revealed in March 2021. Its role is to provide ground units with a mobile system capable of engaging fixed- and rotary-wing aircraft, Group I and II unmanned aerial systems (UAS), loitering munitions and cruise missiles.

Design

The Skyranger 30 follows the same general configuration as the Skyranger 35, a remote turret with a 1.414 m-diameter turret ring, but with less weight of 2-2.5 tonnes enabling it to be installed on lighter 6×6 wheeled vehicles. The turret features a central armored structure with basic Level 2 protection, which can be fitted with add-on armor to increase to Level 4. It is fitted with a modified version of the Oerlikon KCA 30 mm cannon used on the Saab 37 Viggen fighter jet named the KCE.

While it has a shorter effective range than the Skyranger 35 at 3 km, it has a higher rate of fire of 1,200 rounds per minute. It maintains the ability to elevate 85° to combat terminal diving targets. 252 ready rounds are carried. The gun fires a 30 mm airburst munition based on the 35 mm AHEAD ammunition carrying 160 tungsten cylinders, each weighing 1.25 grams for a total payload of 200 grams, which is time-programmed upon leaving the muzzle to open up in front of a target to form a lethal cone.

Additional features include two ROSY (Rapid Obscuring System) launchers each with nine multispectral smoke grenades, a hatch in the hull ceiling for the vehicle commander to view the battlefield from outside, and a coaxial machine gun fitted on the left of the main gun for use as a self-defense weapon.

Due to the system’s reduced weight, the Skyranger 30 turret is able to integrate two short-range surface-to-air missiles (SAMs). Missiles guided by laser beam riding or infrared homing such as the FIM-92 Stinger or Mistral can be integrated, as well as the SkyKnight. Depending on the type, missiles extend range up to 8-9 km, while the gun covers the space under their minimum engagement range.

To detect targets, the Skyranger 30 uses the S-band AESA Multi-Mission Radar (AMMR) developed by Rheinmetall Italia. Five flat antennas integrated around the turret provide full 360° coverage. The AMMR has a detection range of over 20 km for a 1 m2 RCS aircraft, 12 km against hovering helicopters, 10 km against missiles, and 5 km against RAM targets and micro-UAS. For passive detection, the vehicle is installed with Rheinmetall’s FIRST (Fast InfraRed Search and Track), which is optimized to detect pop-up targets such as helicopters. Identification and tracking is handled by a compact target tracker that includes one HD cooled MWIR thermal camera, one full-HD TV camera, and two laser rangefinders, one devoted to air targets and the other for land targets.

Additional add-ons are under consideration, including electronic warfare systems in the form of passive emitter locators to pick up UAV data link signals, as well as RF-jammers to jam such links to neutralize UAVs without using kinetic effectors.

In late 2021, Rheinmetall unveiled the Skyranger 30 high-energy laser (HEL), intended to increase the system's ability to neutralize small targets at greater range and lower cost. The initial power level is 20 kw, with an immediate goal to increase it to 50 kw and an ideal goal of 100 kw.

Operators

Future operators 
 - The government of Hungary signed a MoU in 2021 about developing a Lynx-based air defense vehicle, using the Skyranger 30 turrets with Mistral missiles.

A Pindad Badak chassis with a mockup turret of the Oerlikon Skyranger 30 was shown during 2022 Indonesian Defence Exposition & Forum. Indonesia has not officially stated its plans to acquire the system.

See also 
Skyranger 35
2K22 Tunguska
Pantsir-S1
K30 Biho

References

External links
OERLIKON SKYRANGER® 30 - Rheinmetall Air Defence.
OERLIKON SKYRANGER® MOBILE AIR DEFENCE SYSTEM. Rheinmetall.

Weapon turrets